The 2013–14 Louisiana Tech Bulldogs basketball team represented Louisiana Tech University during the 2013–14 NCAA Division I men's basketball season. The Bulldogs, led by third year head coach Michael White, played their home games at the Thomas Assembly Center and were first year members of the Conference USA. They finished the season 29–8, 13–3 in C-USA play to finish in a four-way tie for the C-USA regular season championship. They advanced to the championship game of the C-USA tournament where they lost to Tulsa. After tiebreakers, they were the #1 seed in the C-USA Tournament, and as a regular season conference champion and overall #1 seed in their conference tournament who failed to win their conference tournament, they received at automatic bid to the National Invitation Tournament where they defeated Iona and Georgia to advance to the quarterfinals where they lost to Florida State.

Roster

Schedule

|-
!colspan=9 style="background:#002F8B; color:#FF0000;"| Exhibition
 
 
|-
!colspan=9 style="background:#002F8B; color:#FF0000;"| Regular season

|-
!colspan=9 style="background:#002F8B; color:#FF0000;"| Conference USA tournament

|-
!colspan=9 style="background:#002F8B; color:#FF0000;"| NIT

References

Louisiana Tech Bulldogs basketball seasons
Louisiana Tech
Louisiana Tech
Louis
Louis